Justin Kloos (born November 30, 1993) is an American professional ice hockey Forward. He is currently playing with Leksands IF in the Swedish Hockey League (SHL). He has previously played in the National Hockey League with the Minnesota Wild and Anaheim Ducks.

Playing career

Junior
Kloos played for Lakeville South High School from 2007 to 2012. In 2011–12, his senior season, he helped his team make a Minnesota State Hockey Tournament appearance.  He also scored 103 points (41G, 62A) in 31 games in his final season with the Lakeville South Cougars. In 2012 he was also named Minnesota Mr. Hockey. Kloos also played Junior hockey in the USHL (United States Hockey League) for the Waterloo Blackhawks in the 2012–13 season. He finished second in the USHL with 87. Of those 87 points, 58 of them were assists, which is the second most in Waterloo history.

College 
In 2013, Kloos played his first season with the Minnesota Gophers. In his freshman season he played in 39 games and  scored 16 goals. With these 16 goals he became the first freshman to lead the team in goals since 2006–07 season. Along with the 16 goals, Kloos also tallied 16 assists. In the NCAA tournament Kloos scored the game-winning goal to send the Gophers to the NCAA Frozen Four. In the 2014-15 season, he also played in 39 games. He scored 13 goals and recorded 19 assists. He scored the game-winning goal in victory over Michigan to secure the Big Ten Championship. In his junior season (2015–16) he was named the team captain. On February 16, 2016 he was named the Big Ten's First star of the week after he netted two goal and two assists against Ohio State. In his senior and final season with the Gophers in 2016–17, Kloos matched his previous seasons totals in points with 43 in 38 games.

Professional
At the conclusion of the Gophers season and his collegiate career, Kloos as an unsigned free agent agreed to terms with home state club, the Minnesota Wild on a two-year entry-level contract on March 29, 2017. He immediately joined AHL affiliate, the Iowa Wild to play out the remainder of the 2016–17 season on an amateur try-out basis. Kloos was called up to the NHL on October 23, 2017, and made his NHL debut on October 24, 2017. He played 8:38 minutes in his NHL debut against the Vancouver Canucks but was reassigned to the AHL the following day.

In the 2018–19 season, Kloos continued in the AHL, leading the Iowa Wild in scoring with 12 goals and 30 points in 34 games. On January 16, 2019, Kloos was traded by the Minnesota Wild to the Anaheim Ducks in exchange for Pontus Åberg.

With the conclusion of his contract with the Ducks approaching after the cancellation of the 2019–20 AHL season due to COVID-19. Kloos ended his tenure with affiliate, the San Diego Gulls posting 30 points in 53 games.

Kloos opted to embark on a career away from North America, agreeing to a one-year contract with Russian outfit, Torpedo Nizhny Novgorod of the Kontinental Hockey League (KHL), on June 8, 2020. In the 2020–21 season, Kloos quickly transitioned to the larger ice, producing 11 goals and 20 points through 48 regular season games.

As a free agent, Kloos moved to Sweden agreeing to a two-year contract with SHL club, Leksands IF, on June 4, 2021.

Career statistics

Awards and honors

References

External links 

1993 births
American men's ice hockey centers
Anaheim Ducks players
Ice hockey players from Minnesota
Iowa Wild players
Leksands IF players
Living people
Minnesota Golden Gophers men's ice hockey players
Minnesota Wild players
People from Lakeville, Minnesota
San Diego Gulls (AHL) players
Torpedo Nizhny Novgorod players
Undrafted National Hockey League players
Waterloo Black Hawks players